Observatoriefjellet is a mountain in Wedel Jarlsberg Land at Spitsbergen, Svalbard.

References

Mountains of Spitsbergen